Isocytosine or 2-aminouracil is a pyrimidine base that is an isomer of cytosine.  It is used in combination with isoguanine in studies of unnatural nucleic acid analogues of the normal base pairs in DNA. In particular, it is used as a nucleobase of hachimoji RNA.

It can be synthesized from guanidine and malic acid.

It is also used in physical chemical studies involving metal complex binding, hydrogen bonding, and tautomerism and proton transfer effects in nucleobases.

References

Pyrimidones
Nucleobases